Haroi (Hroi) is a Chamic language of Vietnam. It is spoken by the Cham  Hroi living in Binh Dinh and Phu Yen provinces.

References

Chamic languages
Languages of Vietnam